Urban Lesjak (born 24 August 1990) is a Slovenian handball player who plays for RK Eurofarm Pelister and the Slovenian national team.

Lesjak represented Slovenia at the 2016 Summer Olympics.

References

1990 births
Living people
Sportspeople from Celje
Slovenian male handball players
Expatriate handball players
Olympic handball players of Slovenia
Handball players at the 2016 Summer Olympics
Slovenian expatriate sportspeople in Germany
Slovenian expatriate sportspeople in North Macedonia
Handball-Bundesliga players
21st-century Slovenian people